ProPublica, legally Pro Publica, Inc., is a nonprofit organization based in New York City. In 2010, it became the first online news source to win a Pulitzer Prize, for a piece written by one of its journalists and published in The New York Times Magazine as well as on ProPublica.org. ProPublica states that its investigations are conducted by its staff of full-time investigative reporters, and the resulting stories are distributed to news partners for publication or broadcast. In some cases, reporters from both ProPublica and its partners work together on a story. ProPublica has partnered with more than 90 different news organizations, and it has won six Pulitzer Prizes.

History 
ProPublica was the brainchild of Herbert and Marion Sandler, the former chief executives of the Golden West Financial Corporation, who have committed $10 million a year to the project. The Sandlers hired Paul Steiger, former managing editor of The Wall Street Journal, to create and run the organization as editor in chief. At the time ProPublica was set up, Steiger responded to concerns about the role of the political views of the Sandlers, saying on The Newshour with Jim Lehrer:

ProPublica had an initial news staff of 28 reporters and editors, including Pulitzer Prize winners Charles Ornstein, Tracy Weber, Jeff Gerth, and Marcus Stern. Steiger was reported to have received 850 applications upon ProPublica's announcement. The organization appointed a 12-member advisory board of professional journalists.

The newsgroup shares its work under the Creative Commons no-derivative, non-commercial license.

On August 5, 2015, Yelp announced a partnership with the company to help improve their healthcare statistics.

Funding 
While the Sandler Foundation provided ProPublica with significant financial support, it also has received funding from the Knight Foundation, MacArthur Foundation, Pew Charitable Trusts, Ford Foundation, the Carnegie Corporation, and the Atlantic Philanthropies. ProPublica and the Knight Foundation have various connections. For example, Paul Steiger, executive chairman of ProPublica, is a trustee of the Knight Foundation. In like manner, Alberto Ibarguen, the president and CEO of the Knight Foundation is on the board of ProPublica. ProPublica, along with other major news outlets, received grant funding from Sam Bankman-Fried, the founder of cryptocurrency exchange FTX.

ProPublica has attracted attention for the salaries it pays its employees. In 2008, Paul Steiger, the editor of ProPublica, received a salary of $570,000. Steiger was formerly the managing editor at The Wall Street Journal, where his total compensation (including options) was double that at ProPublica. Steiger's stated strategy is to use a Wall Street Journal pay model to attract journalistic talent. In 2010, eight ProPublica employees made more than $160,000, including managing editor Stephen Engelberg ($343,463) and the highest-paid reporter, Dafna Linzer, formerly of the Washington Post ($205,445).

Engelberg is a former New York Times editor who co-wrote the non-fiction book Germs: Biological Weapons and America's Secret War, with Times reporter Judith Miller.

Awards 
In 2010, ProPublica jointly won the Pulitzer Prize for Investigative Reporting (it was also awarded to the Philadelphia Daily News for an unrelated story) for "The Deadly Choices at Memorial", "a story that chronicles the urgent life-and-death decisions made by one hospital's exhausted doctors when they were cut off by the floodwaters of Hurricane Katrina." It was written by ProPublica's Sheri Fink and published in The New York Times Magazine as well as on ProPublica.org. This was the first Pulitzer awarded to an online news source. The article also won the 2010 National Magazine Award for Reporting.

In 2011, ProPublica won its second Pulitzer Prize. Reporters Jesse Eisinger and Jake Bernstein won the Pulitzer Prize for National Reporting for their series, The Wall Street Money Machine. This was the first time a Pulitzer was awarded to a group of stories not published in print.

In 2016, ProPublica won its third Pulitzer Prize, this time for Explanatory Reporting, in collaboration with The Marshall Project for "a startling examination and exposé of law enforcement's enduring failures to investigate reports of rape properly and to comprehend the traumatic effects on its victims."

In 2017, ProPublica and the New York Daily News were awarded the Pulitzer Prize for Public Service for a series of reports on the use of eviction rules by the New York City Police Department.

In 2019, the Peabody Awards honored ProPublica with the first-ever Peabody Catalyst Award for releasing audio in 2018 that brought immediate change to a controversial government practice of family separation at the southern border.

Also in 2019, ProPublica reporter Hannah Dreier was awarded the Pulitzer Prize for Feature Writing for her series that followed immigrants on Long Island whose lives were shattered by a botched crackdown on MS-13.

In May 2020, ProPublica won the Pulitzer Prize for Public Service for illuminating public safety gaps in Alaska.

In that same year, ProPublica also won the Pulitzer Prize for National Reporting for coverage of the United States Navy and the collisions of the USS Fitzgerald and USS John S. McCain (DDG-56) with civilian vessels in separate incidents in the western Pacific. The stories were written by T. Christian Miller, Megan Rose and Robert Faturechi.

Notable reporting and projects

"An Unbelievable Story of Rape" 

T. Christian Miller of ProPublica and Ken Armstrong of The Marshall Project collaborated on this piece about the process that discovered a serial rapist in Colorado and Washington state. The piece won a 2016 Pulitzer Prize for Explanatory Reporting. This piece was adapted into the 2019 Netflix series Unbelievable.

IRS and conservative groups 

In December 2012 and January 2013, ProPublica published and reported on confidential pending applications for groups requesting tax-exempt status. In May 2013, after widespread coverage of allegations that the IRS had inappropriately targeted conservative groups, ProPublica clarified that it obtained the documents through a Freedom of Information Act request, writing, "In response to a request for the applications for 67 different nonprofits last November, the Cincinnati office of the IRS sent ProPublica applications or documentation for 31 groups. Nine of those applications had not yet been approved—meaning they were not supposed to be made public." ProPublica reported on six of them, after deeming information within those applications newsworthy.

Psychiatric Solutions 

ProPublica conducted a large-scale, circumscribed investigation on Psychiatric Solutions, a company based in Tennessee that buys failing hospitals, cuts staff, and accumulates profit. The report covered patient deaths at numerous Psychiatric Solutions facilities, the failing physical plant at many of their facilities, and covered the State of Florida's first closure of Manatee Palms Youth Services, which has since been shut down by Florida officials once again. Their report was published in conjunction with the Los Angeles Times.

Documenting Hate 

In 2017, ProPublica launched the Documenting Hate project for systematic tracking of hate crimes and bias incidents. The project is part of their Civil Rights beat, and allows victims or witnesses of hate crime incidents to submit stories. The project also allows journalists and newsrooms to partner with ProPublica to write stories based on the dataset they are collecting. For example, the Minneapolis Star Tribune partnered with ProPublica to write about reporting of hate crimes in Minnesota.

Surgeon Scorecard 

In 2015, ProPublica launched Surgeon Scorecard, an interactive database that allows users to view complication rates for eight common elective procedures. The tool allows users to find surgeons and hospitals, and see their complication rates. The database was controversial, drawing criticism from doctors and prompting a critique from RAND. However, statisticians, including Andrew Gelman, stood behind their decision to attempt to shine light on an opaque aspect of the medical field, and ProPublica offered specific rebuttals to RAND's claims.

Tracking evictions and rent stabilization in New York City 
ProPublica has created an interactive map that allows people to search for addresses in New York City to see the effects of eviction cases. The app was nominated for a Livingston Award.

Taxes paid by wealthiest Americans
In June 2021, after receiving leaked, hacked, or stolen IRS documents, ProPublica published a report which showed that tax rates for the wealthiest Americans were significantly lower than the average middle class tax rate, when considering unrealized capital gains as being equivalent to earned income. ProPublica would later reveal that technology investor and political donor Peter Thiel legally earned over $5 billion in a tax-free Roth IRA account through his investments in private companies. Attorney General Merrick Garland told lawmakers that investigating the source of the release would be a top priority for the Justice Department.

Board members

See also

References

External links 
 
 
 

2007 establishments in New York City
501(c)(3) organizations
American journalism organizations
American news websites
Crowdfunded journalism
Investigative journalism
Non-profit organizations based in New York City
Organizations based in Manhattan
Organizations established in 2007
Pulitzer Prize for Public Service winners
Tor onion services
Nonprofit newspapers